Wray Castle is a Victorian neo-gothic building at Claife in the English county of Cumbria.
The house and grounds have belonged to the National Trust since 1929, and house has opened to the public on a regular basis since 2013. The grounds, which include part of the shoreline of Windermere, are open all year round and are renowned for their selection of specimen trees – Wellingtonia, redwood, Ginkgo biloba, weeping lime and varieties of beech.

Between March and October, Windermere Lake Cruises operate a passenger boat service on Windermere from Ambleside and the Brockhole National Park Visitor Centre to Wray Castle.

History
The house was built in 1840 for a retired Liverpudlian surgeon, James Dawson, who built it along with the neighbouring Wray Church using his wife's fortune. After Dawson's death in 1875 the estate was inherited by his fifteen year old nephew, Edward Preston Rawnsley. In 1877 Edward's cousin, Hardwicke Rawnsley, took up the appointment of vicar of Wray Church. To protect the countryside from damaging development, Hardwicke Rawnsley, building on an idea propounded by John Ruskin, conceived of a National Trust that could buy and preserve places of natural beauty and historic interest for the nation.

The house has an association with another key player in the National Trust, Beatrix Potter, who spent a summer holiday there when she was 16 in 1882. She bought a small farm in the Claife area, Hill Top, in 1905 with royalties from her first book The Tale of Peter Rabbit. She went on to buy considerable tracts of land nearby, though she never owned the castle itself.

Since the National Trust acquired the castle it has been used for a variety of purposes, for short time from 1929 being a youth hostel For twenty years from 1931 the castle housed the offices of the Freshwater Biological Association.

From 1958 to 1998 it became a training college for Merchant Navy radio officers (RMS Wray Castle), with up to 150 cadets living in the castle while studying the procedures and regulations regarding the use of radio for the "Safety of Life at Sea".
The Global Maritime Distress and Safety System or GMDSS was introduced in 1988 and all ships had to be fitted by 1999, thus bringing to an end the position of radio officer. In 1995 the last 'Radio Officer' left and the college diversified into ROV and general telecoms training, continuing to use the name Wray Castle Limited. Wray Castle Limited continues to issue GMDSS licenses as part of its role operating the national administration centre on behalf of AMERC (Association of Marine Electronic and Radio Colleges), relocating away from the Castle in 2004.

In 2011 the National Trust proposed to lease the property, which had been denuded of its furnishings, for use as a hotel.
However, they decided to open it to the public during the visitor season that year.  High visitor numbers meant that the property, which in its empty state was particularly child-friendly, had clear potential to be developed as a visitor attraction.  In 2014 the Trust applied for retrospective planning permission to change the use of the listed building to visitor attraction.

Legacy

Two ships were named after the site, both built for the Lancashire Shipping Company (also known as The Castle Line) of James Chalmers & Co. The first was one of five large vessels built at the Williamson shipyard at Workington, the others being Greystoke Castle, Lancaster Castle, Lowther Castle and Pendragon Castle. The Wray Castle was the fourth, a steel ocean-going three-masted sailing ship of 1,937 GRT, launched in March 1889. She had a long career, surviving a serious fire in her hold in 1906 and was eventually wrecked in islands off Coronel, Chile, in 1924. The second was a steam ship of 4.253 GRT built by William Hamilton of Glasgow in 1938. She was torpedoed and sunk off Freetown, West Africa in May 3 1941.

See also

 Grade II* listed buildings in South Lakeland
 Listed buildings in Claife
 Hawkshead and Claife

References

External links

 National Trust – Wray Castle
 Ambleside – Wray Castle
 Gwynedd Maritime Database – Fleet of R.Thomas & Co of Criccieth and Liverpool

Beatrix Potter
British Merchant Navy
Country houses in Cumbria
Gothic Revival architecture in Cumbria
Grade II* listed houses in Cumbria
Mock castles in England
National Trust properties in the Lake District
Tourist attractions in Cumbria
Youth hostels in England and Wales